Sunflower is the debut single album by South Korean singer Yoojung. It was released by Fantagio on September 14, 2022 and contains three tracks, including the lead single of the same name.

Background and release
On August 23, it was reported that Choi would make her solo debut in September. It was confirmed by Fantagio that Choi will make her solo debut with the single album Sunflower which will be released on September 14, 2022. On August 29, the prologue film was released with the scheduler being released on August 30. The track list consisting of 3 tracks was released on August 31. The first and second concept photos were released on September 1 and 2 respectively. Choi released the album preview on September 5. The third and fourth concept photos were released on September 6 and 7 respectively. The highlight medley was released on September 8. The music video teaser was released on September 13. The album, along with the music video for the title track, was released on September 14.

Track listing

Charts

Weekly charts

Monthly charts

Release history

References

2022 albums
Single albums
Korean-language albums